(also written 2002 JE9) is an Apollo near-Earth asteroid and potentially hazardous object. It has a well determined orbit with an observation arc of 10 years and an Uncertainty Parameter of 1. It was removed from the Sentry Risk Table on 10 May 2002.  was discovered on 6 May 2002 by the Lincoln Near-Earth Asteroid Research (LINEAR) project using a  Reflecting telescope; at the time of discovery, the asteroid possessed an apparent magnitude of 19.1.

During the close approach in 1971 the asteroid reached about apparent magnitude 10, about the same brightness as Saturn's moon Iapetus.

The asteroid will pass  from Venus on 25 November 2021.

References

External links 
 
 
 

612358
612358
612358
612358
20020506